Kiebingen is a suburban district of Rottenburg am Neckar in the administrative district of Tübingen in Baden-Württemberg (Germany).

Geography 

Kiebingen is located 3 km (1.9 mi) eastern from Rottenburg and 8 km (5 mi) western from Tübingen in the valley of the Neckar river.

Extent 

The area of the district is 514 hectares. Thereof fall 60.1% upon agriculturally used area, 21.7% upon forest area, 14.7% upon settlement area and roads, 2.7% upon water extent and 0.8% upon other.

Neighbour localities 

The territories of the following localities adjoin to Kiebingen, they are called clockwise beginning in the north: Wurmlingen, Hirschau, Bühl and Rottenburg (town), (all in the admin. district of Tübingen). Wurmlingen is also a suburb of Rottenburg, Hirschau and Bühl are suburbs of Tübingen. Wurmlingen and Hirschau are situated northern, Kiebingen and Bühl southern of the Neckar.

Population 

Kiebingen has 2007 residents (31/01/08). It is the third largest suburb of Rottenburg. At an area of 5.14 km² (2 sq mi) this corresponds to a population density of 390 people per km², or 1011 per sq mi.

Faiths 

The population of the village is predominantly Roman Catholic.

Politics

Sister Village 
 Lion-sur-Mer (France) since 1988

Personalities

Honorary Citizens 

Persons, who got the honorary citizenship by the former Municipality of Kiebingen:

 1938: Karl Franz Ferdinand Viktor Osterwald, (operator of the local power station)

References

External links 
 Official Webpage (German)

Rottenburg am Neckar